Megacraspedus lativalvellus is a moth of the family Gelechiidae. It was described by Hans Georg Amsel in 1954. It is found on Malta.

References

 "Eulamprotes nigritella (Zeller, 1847)". Insecta.pro. Retrieved February 5, 2020.

Moths described in 1954
Megacraspedus